The women's 100 metres event at the 1970 British Commonwealth Games was held on 17 and 18 July at the Meadowbank Stadium in Edinburgh, Scotland. It was the first time that the metric distance was contested at the Games replacing the 100 yards event.

Medalists

Results

Heats
Held on 17 July

Qualification: First 3 in each heat (Q) qualify directly for the semifinals.

Wind:Heat 1: +2.2 m/s, Heat 2: +5.7 m/s, Heat 3: +4.9 m/s, Heat 4: +4.3 m/s, Heat 5: +5.4 m/s

Semifinals
Held on 18 July

Qualification: First 4 in each semifinal (Q) qualify directly for the final.

Wind:Heat 1: +4.1 m/s, Heat 2: +4.1 m/s

Final
Held on 18 July

Wind: +5.3 m/s

References

Heats results (p28)
Semifinals & Final results (p9)
Australian results

Athletics at the 1970 British Commonwealth Games
1970